Gav or GAV may refer to:

Arts and media
 Gāv ("The Cow"), a 1969 Iranian movie
 Govindudu Andarivadele, a 2014 Telugu film starring Ram Charan

Economics
 Gross annual value, a municipal value of the actual rent or fair rental value
 Gross asset value, a value of consolidated properties a company owns

Places
 Gav, Iran, a village in East Azerbaijan Province
 Gav, Sistan and Baluchestan, a village in Sistan and Baluchestan Province, Iran
 Granville railway station, New South Wales, Australia, station code

Other uses
 Gavin, a male given name
 Gav-Paradhi, one of the Paradhi Tribes of India
 General Assembly of Victoria, of the Presbyterian Church of Victoria, Australia
 Gymnazium Andreja Vrabla, a school in Levice, Slovakia